The 2016 Mississippi State Bulldogs baseball team represents the Mississippi State University in the 2016 NCAA Division I baseball season. The Bulldogs play their home games at Dudy Noble Field.

Personnel

Roster

Coaching staff

Schedule and results

† Indicates the game does not count toward the 2016 Southeastern Conference standings.
*Rankings are based on the team's current  ranking in the Collegiate Baseball poll.

Record vs. conference opponents

Rankings

MLB Draft
A school record 11 players were selected in the draft. It is 3rd most in the NCAA for the 2016 season trailing only Texas A&M with 13 and Southern California with 12.

† Rooker returned to Mississippi State rather than signing with the Twins. In 2017 the Minnesota Twins draft him in the 1st round.

References

Mississippi State
Mississippi State Bulldogs baseball seasons
Southeastern Conference baseball champion seasons
Mississippi State
Miss